The Australian Surf Life Saving Championships  known as The Aussies is the national Surf lifesaving championships for Australia. It is the largest surf lifesaving event in Australia and the largest event of its kind in the world. It is organised by the Surf Life Saving Australia, and had been held annually since 1915.

The first Australian Surf Life Saving Championships were held at Bondi Beach, New South Wales in March 1915. 

During the 2015 Championships 7,000 surf lifesavers, representing 311 Surf Life Saving Clubs, will be competing in over 380 events in Youth Championships, Masters Championships and Open Championships. The 2019 Championships will be held at Broadbeach, Gold Coast, Queensland.

List of Championships

List of Ironman and Ironwoman Champions
Held at the Australian Surf Life Saving Championships every year, the Australian Ironman and Ironwoman Title is awarded to the winners of these events. The format is the same as for typical surf carnivals, a 10-to-20-minute race with a field of 150 competitors, which over several rounds of will be reduced to a final of 16 athletes. These are the blue ribbon events the Championships, and also the ones that attracts the most attention in terms of television and spectators on the beach. The events are typically the last events on the program, raced on a final day of competition.
.

See also
Ironman (surf lifesaving)
World Life Saving Championships

References

External links
 The Aussies webpage

National championships in Australia
Sport in Australia
Surf lifesaving
Sports originating in Australia
Lifesaving in Australia
Recurring sporting events established in 1915
1915 establishments in Australia